The Wijnbergshofje is a hofje in Haarlem, Netherlands, on the Barrevoetstraat.

It was founded in 1662 by the Mennonite Church. It was renovated in 1872 and contains 9 houses for pensioners. This hofje is one of four Mennonite hofjes in Haarlem; the others are the Zuiderhofje in the Zuiderstraat, the Bruiningshofje on the Botermarkt, and the Blokshofje on the Klein Heiligland sold in 1970. 

The regents' room located in the back garden has been a national monument in the Netherlands for a long time. In 1999 the 9 houses were also declared a national monument.

References

 Handout for visitors during Monument Day, September, 2008.
 Het Zuiderhofje te Haarlem, by Hans Vogelesang, Impressum Haarlem, 1992, 
 Deugd boven geweld, Een geschiedenis van Haarlem, 1245–1995, edited by Gineke van der Ree-Scholtens, 1995, 

Hofjes
Buildings and structures completed in 1662
Rijksmonuments in Haarlem
1662 establishments in the Dutch Republic